Muncaster Castle is a privately owned castle overlooking the River Esk, about a mile east of the west-coastal town of Ravenglass in Cumbria, England. It is recorded in the National Heritage List for England as a designated Grade I listed building.

History

The place is now corruptly known as "Muncaster", which first appeared in a Cumberland church register in 1577, the original name according to all old evidence and records being "Mulcaster", registered in the pipe rolls of Cumberland circa 1150 (also as Molecaster and Mulecaster in 1190 and 1236 respectively).

The placename "Muncaster" contains the Latin word castra, meaning "encampment", or "fort". It is suspected that the site of the castle lies on foundations dating to the Roman era, which, if they exist, may represent a castellum for the nearby Roman fort of Glannoventa at Ravenglass.

The Muncaster estate was granted to Alan de Penitone in 1208. The oldest parts of the castle include the Great Hall and the 14th-century pele tower, a type of watch-tower fortification unique to the English-Scottish border region.

Between 1860 and 1866 Anthony Salvin extensively remodelled Muncaster Castle for the Barons Muncaster. Sir John Frecheville Ramsden, 6th Baronet discussed proposed modifications to the castle with Edwin Lutyens from 1916, but nothing came of these; Lutyens did design the Muncaster War Memorial, constructed in 1922, on a commission from Ramsden.

Muncaster's gardens include features designed to take advantage of views of the Esk Valley and the mountains.  There is an aviary containing owls and other raptor birds from Britain and overseas. There are daily flying displays of these birds. There is an indoor maze themed on the life of a field vole.

Muncaster Castle is still owned by the Pennington family, who have lived at Muncaster for at least 800 years, and a family residence. Until her death in 2011, Phyllida Gordon-Duff-Pennington and her husband Patrick Gordon-Duff-Pennington (1930–2021) worked for three decades to restore the castle from a "crumbling relic" and establish it as a place for tourism and events. Since 2021, the owners are Peter and Iona Frost-Pennington, with their elder son Ewan the "Muncaster's operations director". It now has more than 90,000 visitors a year.

In October 2021, the castle was one of 142 sites across England to receive part of a £35-million injection into the government's Culture Recovery Fund.

The Luck of Muncaster

After the Battle of Towton in 1461, according to tradition, Henry VI fled to Muncaster Castle where Sir John Pennington sheltered him. Henry gave Sir John a Venetian glass drinking bowl, with a wish: "As long as this bowl remains unriven, Penningtons from Muncaster never shall be driven". The glass, which is still intact, and still at the castle, is now known as "The Luck of Muncaster".

Tom Fool 
Each year the castle recruits its own jester in the culmination of a competition that celebrates the art of tomfoolery. The last jester, named Thomas Skelton, whose full-length portrait hangs at the castle, is believed to be the original Tom Fool, who is often said to have inspired Shakespeare's Fool in King Lear. Legend has it that Skelton was enlisted by Wild Will of Whitbeck to behead a carpenter's son, Dick, a servant at the castle, who was an unwanted suitor of his betrothed, Helwise Pennington, the unmarried daughter of Sir Alan Pennington. He is rumoured to have said, "There, I have hid Dick’s head under a heap of shavings; and he will not find that so easily, when he awakes, as he did my shillings."

See also

 Grade I listed buildings in Cumbria
 Listed buildings in Muncaster
 List of work on castles and country houses by Anthony Salvin
 Luck of Edenhall
 Castles in England
 List of historic houses in England

References
Citations

Sources

External links

 
 Gatehouse Gazetteer record for Muncaster Castle, containing a comprehensive bibliography
 Muncaster Castle and Ravenglass Bath House

Houses completed in the 14th century
Towers completed in the 14th century
Castles in Cumbria
Peel towers in Cumbria
Country houses in Cumbria
Grade I listed buildings in Cumbria
Grade II* listed parks and gardens in Cumbria
Historic house museums in Cumbria
Anthony Salvin buildings